Southern Exposure is an album by the American musician Maceo Parker. It was released in 1993. Although marketed as a jazz album, Parker considered it to be "98%" funk.

The album peaked at No. 33 on Billboard'''s Jazz Albums chart.

Production
The album was produced by Stephan Meyner and Parker. The Rebirth Brass Band played on the album, as did Leo Nocentelli and George Porter Jr. of the Meters. Parker's ex-bandmates Fred Wesley and Pee Wee Ellis played trombone and tenor saxophone, respectively. The album was recorded in New Orleans.

Critical receptionThe Boston Globe praised the "stripped-bare style of vintage New Orleans funk." The Philadelphia Inquirer wrote that "Parker works simple blues phrases into a spitfiring fury."

The Calgary Herald stated that the "music is rooted in the chattering percussion and jerky rhythms of New Orleans, with heavy emphasis on the blues." The Indianapolis Star'' noted that "on Joe Zawinul's 'Mercy, Mercy, Mercy', a favorite cover of black college bands, Parker and the Rebirth Brass Band add their own Dixieland swagger, the tempo maintained nicely by Philip Frazier's rumbling tuba."

AllMusic wrote that "Parker's alto sounds close to Hank Crawford at times but with a phrasing of his own."

Track listing

References

Maceo Parker albums
1993 albums
Novus Records albums